On 18 May 1848, elected deputies of the Frankfurt National Assembly gathered in the Kaisersaal and walked solemnly to the Paulskirche to hold the first session of the new Parliament, under its chairman (by seniority) Friedrich Lang. Then, Heinrich Gagern of Wiesbaden  was elected president of the parliament.

The total number of sitting deputies at any given time would vary considerably during the life of the National Assembly. Sittings were regular, yet many deputies failed to appear, protested various sittings, were replaced by proxies, or removed from the sittings. In total, there were 809 deputies between 18 May 1848 and the forcible closure of the Rump Parliament on 18 June 1849.

The following 379 deputies were recorded in attendance in the first sitting of the National Assembly on 18 May 1848:

A

B

C

D

E

F

G

H

I

K

L

M

N

O

P

Q

R

S

T

U

V

W

Z

Bibliography 

Stenographischer Bericht über die Verhandlungen der deutschen constituirenden NationalVersammlung zu Frankfurt a. M.; I. Abonnement, Nr. 1, Sonnabend, 2. Mai 1848. NOTE: The list in this document contains various errors which have been reproduced in the table above. Corrections to surnames or placenames are listed in parentheses next to the 2 May 1848 information.

Sources 
Sources in the German Federal Archives
 Sources (in German) by the German Federal Central Office for Political Education
Text of the Paulskirche Constitution on Documentarchiv.de
Collection of pamphlets from 1848 by Frankfurt University – includes official documents and books
Gutenberg-DE: Article by  Karl Marx in the Neue Rheinische Zeitung 2008/50

Others 
 Paper in the German Federal Archive
 Abstract of a themed volume by the Bundeszentrale für politische Bildung
 Informationpage by the Bundestag

Lists of members of parliament
Lists of political office-holders in Germany
 

de:Liste der Mitglieder der Frankfurter Nationalversammlung